Apamea antennata is a moth of the family Noctuidae. It is widespread in the forests of western North America.

This wingspan is about 44 mm. The forewing is reddish brown with large discal spots and it has a purplish postmedian band and toothed submarginal line. The adult flies in early and midsummer. The larva feeds on grasses.

Subspecies
Apamea antennata antennata
Apamea antennata purpurissata (British Columbia)

References

External links
A. antennata Images. Mississippi Entomological Museum, MSU.
Bug Guide

Apamea (moth)
Moths of North America
Moths described in 1891